Celastrina neglecta, the summer azure,  is a butterfly of the family Lycaenidae. It is found in North America. Layberry, Hall, and Lafontaine, in The Butterflies of Canada, describe the species:
The upper surface is pale blue with an extensive dusting of white scales, especially on the hindwing. In some females the blue is almost entirely replaced by white with a small amount of blue near the wing bases. Females have a broad blackish-grey band on the outer third and costa of the forewing. The underside is chalky white to pale grey with tiny dark grey spots and a zigzagged submarginal line on the hindwing.

The summer azure occurs across most of eastern and central United States as well as southern Canada from Nova Scotia to southern Saskatchewan. Adults fly from mid-June until early October with two or three generations in the south.

The taxonomic status of this butterfly, originally described as Lycaena neglecta Edwards, 1862, has been in flux over the years. It was at one time treated as a synonym of Celastrina argiolus lucia (Lycaena lucia Kirby, 1837).

Similar species
Spring azure (C. ladon)
Cherry gall azure (C. serotina)
Holly azure (C. idella)
Lucia azure (C. lucia)

References

External links

Summer azure, Butterflies and Moths of North America

Celastrina
Butterflies of North America
Butterflies described in 1862
Taxa named by William Henry Edwards